The 2021 Copa CONMEBOL Sudamericana was the 20th edition of the CONMEBOL Sudamericana (also referred to as the Copa Sudamericana, or ), South America's secondary club football tournament organized by CONMEBOL.

Starting from this season, teams must be in the top division of their member association to play in South American club competitions, except for teams which are champions of the qualifying tournaments or cups.

On 14 May 2020, CONMEBOL announced the candidate venues for the 2021, 2022 and 2023 club competition finals. On 13 May 2021, CONMEBOL announced that the final would be played at the Estadio Centenario in Montevideo, Uruguay on 6 November 2021, but on 27 July 2021 the final was eventually confirmed to have been rescheduled to 20 November 2021.

Brazilian club Athletico Paranaense defeated fellow Brazilian club Red Bull Bragantino by a 1–0 score in the final to win their second tournament title. As winners of the 2021 Copa Sudamericana, Athletico Paranaense earned the right to play against the winners of the 2021 Copa Libertadores in the 2022 Recopa Sudamericana. They also automatically qualified for the 2022 Copa Libertadores group stage.

Defensa y Justicia were the defending champions, but did not play this edition since they qualified for the 2021 Copa Libertadores group stage as Copa Sudamericana champions and later advanced to the knockout stage.

Format changes
On 2 October 2020, CONMEBOL's Council approved the implementation of format changes to the Copa Sudamericana starting from this edition, aimed at ensuring that each of the countries is better represented in the different stages of the competition. The following changes were implemented:
The tournament was expanded from 54 to 56 teams, with all four Copa Libertadores third stage losers entering the competition instead of the two best teams eliminated.
In the first stage, teams from all associations other than Argentina and Brazil played against a team from their same association in double-legged ties with the winners qualifying for a 32-team group stage, ensuring that at least two teams from each association will take part in the group stage.
A group stage was included, with teams from Argentina and Brazil directly entering the Copa Sudamericana entering the competition at this stage, joining the 16 first stage winners and the four teams eliminated in the Copa Libertadores third stage. The winners of each group qualified for the round of 16.
The eight third-placed teams of the Copa Libertadores group stage entered the competition at the round of 16.

Teams
The following 44 teams from the 10 CONMEBOL associations qualified for the tournament:
Argentina and Brazil: 6 berths each
All other associations: 4 berths each

The entry stage is determined as follows:
 Group stage: 12 teams (teams from Argentina and Brazil)
 First stage: 32 teams (teams from all other associations)

A further 12 teams eliminated from the 2021 Copa Libertadores were transferred to the Copa Sudamericana, entering the group stage (four teams) and the round of 16 (eight teams).

Notes

Schedule
The schedule of the competition will be as follows:

Draws

First stage

Group stage

Group A

Group B

Group C

Group D

Group E

Group F

Group G

Group H

Final stages

Seeding

Bracket

Round of 16

Quarter-finals

Semi-finals

Final

Statistics

Top scorers

See also
2021 Copa Libertadores

References

External links
CONMEBOL Sudamericana 2021, CONMEBOL.com

 
2021
2